Commonwealth of Independent States Free Trade Area (CISFTA) is a free-trade area among Russia, Ukraine, Belarus, Uzbekistan, Moldova, Armenia, Kyrgyzstan, Kazakhstan and Tajikistan. Five CISFTA participants, all except Ukraine, Uzbekistan, Moldova and Tajikistan, are members of the Eurasian Economic Union, comprising a single economic market, although Uzbekistan and Moldova are observers.

History 
The Commonwealth of Independent States Free Trade Zone Agreement, proposed since the breakup of the Soviet Union in 1991, was signed on 18 October 2011 by Russia, Ukraine, Belarus, Kazakhstan, Kyrgyzstan, Tajikistan, Moldova and Armenia.  The agreement replaces existing bilateral and multilateral free trade agreements among the countries. Initially, the treaty was only ratified by Russia, Belarus, and Ukraine, however by the end of 2012, Kazakhstan, Armenia, and Moldova had also completed ratification. In December 2013, Uzbekistan signed and then ratified the treaty, while the remaining two signatories, Kyrgyzstan and Tajikistan, later both ratified the treaty in January 2014 and December 2015 respectively. Azerbaijan is the only full CIS member state not to participate in the free trade area.

European Union–Ukraine trade agreement controversy
From 1 January 2016, Ukraine and the European Union started provisionally applying a Deep and Comprehensive Free Trade Agreement. Member states of the Eurasian Economic Union (EEU or EAEU) held consultations on 22 December 2015 to discuss the implications of the agreement concerning the possible duty-free transit of EU goods into the EEU via Ukraine. The states agreed to implement a provisional scheme later in 2016 that would impose customs checks on goods entering the EEU from Ukraine; and long term, to establish a common information system to control all imports into the EEU's customs area. Nonetheless, Russia promulgated a decree in mid-December 2015 suspending its CIS Free Trade Agreement with respect to Ukraine from 1 January 2016. In late December, the Ukrainian Government responded by passing trade restrictions on Russia, with effect from 2 January 2016. Agreements between Ukraine and other EEU states within the free trade area remain in effect.

On 1 November 2022, Verkhovna Rada MP Roksolana Pidlasa made a draft bill to denounce the proposed to Treaty on the Free Trade Area (CIS) dated 18 October 2011. After meeting with Prime Minister Denys Shmyhal, she said, "It is time to decolonize our trade. We have bilateral free trade agreements with all CIS member countries, the GUAM Free Trade Agreement, and we also apply the Pan-Euro-Med regional convention with Georgia and Moldova. There are many tools that work for Ukrainian manufacturers. There is no need to participate in a treaty where Russia imposes its rules and uses the right of force."

Signature and ratification

An overview of signatures and ratifications is shown below:

See also 
 Commonwealth of Independent States
 Economic integration
 Eurasian Union
 Free trade areas in Europe
 Post-Soviet states
 Trade bloc
 Rules of Origin
 Market access
 Free-trade area
 Tariff

References

Footnotes

Online sources

External links 
 Text of agreement

Free trade agreements
Treaties concluded in 2011
Treaties entered into force in 2012
Commonwealth of Independent States
Treaties of Russia
Treaties of Ukraine
Treaties of Belarus
Treaties of Kazakhstan
Treaties of Kyrgyzstan
Treaties of Tajikistan
Treaties of Moldova
Treaties of Armenia
Free-trade areas